The 2009 Keio Challenger was a professional tennis tournament played on outdoor hard courts. It was the seventh edition of the tournament which was part of the 2009 ATP Challenger Tour. It took place in Yokohama, Japan between 16 and 22 November 2009.

ATP entrants

Seeds

 Rankings are as of November 9, 2009.

Other entrants
The following players received wildcards into the singles main draw:
  Sho Aida
  Toshihide Matsui
  Koki Matsunaga
  Junn Mitsuhashi

The following players received entry from the qualifying draw:
  Chen Ti
  Yuichi Ito
  Alexander Kudryavtsev
  Yi Chu-huan

Champions

Singles

 Takao Suzuki def.  Martin Fischer, 6–4, 7–6(5)

Doubles

 Yang Tsung-hua /  Yi Chu-huan def.  Alexey Kedryuk /  Junn Mitsuhashi, 6–7(9), 6–3, [12–10]

External links
ITF search 
2009 draws

 
2009 in Japanese tennis